Fear And Saturday Night is the fifth studio album by Americana singer-songwriter Ryan Bingham, released on January 20, 2015. The album was recorded with producer Jim Scott and will be self-released through Bingham's independent record label Axster Bingham Records.

Composition
According to Rolling Stone Country, "Bingham wrote most of the album's 12 tracks alone in an airstream trailer, parked in the mountains of California without electricity or cell phones. The seclusion gave him creative clarity that resulted in songs inspired by an unstable childhood, and by the deaths of his mother to alcoholism and father to suicide."

Production
The album was recorded with a new band recruited from members of Rose Hill Drive, and co-produced with Jim Scott, known for engineering Tom Petty's 1995 album Wildflowers, mixing Foo Fighters' 2002 album One by One, and co-producing Wilco's self-titled Wilco (The Album) in 2009.

Track listing

Charts

References

Ryan Bingham albums
2015 albums
Albums produced by Jim Scott (producer)